Fabiano Pereira da Costa (born 6 April 1978) is a former footballer who last played as a midfielder for XV de Piracicaba.

Career 
Born in Marília, Brazil, Fabiano began his professional career with São Paulo in 1996, where he remained until 2001, when he moved to Portuguesa. He moved again in 2002, playing for Santos for a year, before transferring to Spain, where he played for Albacete Balompié during the 2003–04 season.

Following his stay with Albacete, Fabiano moved to Necaxa, where he appeared in 16 games during the 2004 Apertura, scoring three goals.

He was traded to Puebla F.C. for the Apertura 2008 season, on 12 March 2009 Clube Atlético Mineiro bought midfielder, the ex player of São Paulo FC, arrives from Puebla ( Mexican club ). Fabiano has signed with the Brazilian club until 31 December 2010.

Fabiano competed for Brazil at the 2000 Summer Olympics.

References

External links

1978 births
Living people
People from Marília
Brazilian footballers
Brazilian expatriate footballers
Brazil international footballers
Brazil under-20 international footballers
Olympic footballers of Brazil
Footballers at the 2000 Summer Olympics
Campeonato Brasileiro Série A players
São Paulo FC players
Santos FC players
Clube Atlético Mineiro players
Sport Club do Recife players
Avaí FC players
Ettifaq FC players
Grêmio Osasco Audax Esporte Clube players
Esporte Clube XV de Novembro (Piracicaba) players
La Liga players
Albacete Balompié players
Liga MX players
Saudi Professional League players
Club Necaxa footballers
Club Puebla players
Association football forwards
Expatriate footballers in Mexico
Expatriate footballers in Saudi Arabia
Expatriate footballers in Spain
Brazilian expatriate sportspeople in Saudi Arabia
Footballers from São Paulo (state)